= Tangchylar =

Tatar revolutionary political group prominent in 1906

Tangchylar was a Tatar revolutionary political group in the Russian Empire. The group was named after a publication it issued, Tang yulduzy ('Morning Star'). The Tangchylar party, albeit organizationally independent, was inspired by the Russian Socialist-Revolutionaries. The Tangchylar party emerged in the spring of 1906 in Kazan. The core founding group of the Tangchylar came from the Islah movement, including personalities such as Ayaz Ishaki, Shakir Mohammedyarov, Fuad Tuktar and Abdullah Devletshin. The party called for an immediate transfer of all lands to the people and, if applicable, industries to the workers.

Tang yulduzy first appeared in May 1906. In total 63 issues were published of the newspaper, which was one of the most militant Tatar publications at the time, were published until September 1906.

The relationship between the Tangchylar group and the moderate Ittifaq ul-Muslimin was strained and at times antagonistic.

In 1907 the Tangchylar party was crushed by the Czarist police.
